The Canadian Country Music Hall of Fame honours Canadian country music artists, builders or broadcasters, living or deceased.  The artifact collection includes extensive biographical information on the inductees. It  is located in downtown Merritt, British Columbia at 2025 Quilchena Avenue.   The facility is open year-round for custom tours, and is open to the public on seasonally adjusted hours. The initiative is governed by a not-for-profit society (the Canadian Country Music Heritage Society).

In 2009, Cantos Music Foundation (now the National Music Centre) in Calgary, Alberta, became the owner of the Canadian Country Music Hall of Fame's artifact collection after a transfer of ownership from Deb Buck, wife of deceased Hall of Fame member Gary Buck. The plaques of the inductees reside in the Hall of Honour at the Hall of Fame (in Merritt). For several years the Hall of Fame was based in a log building on the Calgary Stampede grounds.

In 1993, Canadian singer-songwriter Stompin' Tom Connors declined an induction into the Hall of Fame, as part of his ongoing campaign against the Americanization of Canadian music.

Inductees 
1984
Wilf Carter (artist)
Tommy Hunter (artist)
Orval Prophet (artist)
William Harold Moon (builder)

1985
Don Messer (artist)
Hank Snow (artist)

1986
Papa Joe Brown (artist)

1987
Lucille Starr (artist)

1988
Jack Feeney (builder)

1989
Charlie Chamberlain (artist)
Al Cherney (artist)
King Ganam (artist)
Dallas Harms (artist)
Earl Heywood (artist)
Marg Osburne (artist)
Ian Tyson (artist)
Mercey Brothers (artist)
Maurice Bolyer (artist / builder)
Don Grashey (builder)

1990
Gordie Tapp (artist)
Ron Sparling (builder)

1991
Rhythm Pals (artist)
A. Hugh Joseph (builder)

1992
Carroll Baker (artist)
Gordon Burnett (builder)

1993
Ward Allen (artist)
Stu Phillips (artist)
Bob Nolan (artist)
Stu Davis (artist)
Ted Daigle (builder)
Frank Jones (builder)

1994
Dick Damron (artist)
Hank Smith (builder)

1995
Gene MacLellan (artist)
Stan Klees (builder)

1996
Myrna Lorrie (artist)
Larry Delaney (builder)

1997
Family Brown (artist)
Sam Sniderman (builder)

1998
Ray Griff (artist)
Bill Anderson (builder)

1999
Ronnie Prophet (artist)
Walt Grealis (builder)

2000
Colleen Peterson (artist)
Leonard Rambeau (builder)

2001
Gordon Lightfoot (artist)
Gary Buck (builder)

2002
Anne Murray (artist)
Art Snider (builder)
Bev Munro (broadcaster)
D'Arcy Scott (broadcaster)
Elmer Tippe (broadcaster)

2003
Sylvia Tyson (artist)
J. Edward Preston (builder)
Fred King (broadcaster)
Charlie Russell (broadcaster)
Art Wallman (broadcaster)

2004
The Good Brothers (artist)
"Weird" Harold Kendall (broadcaster)

2005
Gary Fjellgaard (artist)
R. Harlan Smith (builder)
Paul Kennedy (broadcaster)

2006
Terry Carisse (artist)
Brian Ahern (builder)
Curley Gurlock (broadcaster)

2007
John Allan Cameron (artist)
Sheila Hamilton (builder)
Cliff Dumas (broadcaster)

2008
Prairie Oyster (artist)
Brian Ferriman (builder)
Wes Montgomery (broadcaster)

2009
Buffy Sainte-Marie (artist)
Barry Haugen (builder)
John Murphy (broadcaster)

2010
Willie P. Bennett (artist)
Marie Bottrell (artist)
Donna Anderson & LeRoy Anderson (artist)
Eddie Eastman (artist)
Don Harron (artist)
Fred McKenna (artist)
Wayne Rostad (artist)
Joyce Smith (artist)
Hal & Ginger Willis (artist)
Ray St. Germain (artist)
Tom Tompkins (builder)

2011
Michelle Wright (artist)
Bill Langstroth (builder)

2012
Johnny Burke (artist)
Ralph Murphy (builder)

2013
Rita MacNeil (artist)
Ed Harris (builder)

2014
Wendell Ferguson (artist)
Ron Sakamoto (builder)

2015
Dianne Leigh (artist)
Elizabeth "Ma" Henning (builder)

2016
Murray McLauchlan (artist)
Paul Mascioli (builder)

2017
Paul Brandt (artist)
L. Harvey Gold (builder)

2018
Terri Clark (artist)
Jackie Rae Greening (builder)

2019
Charlie Major (artist)
Anya Wilson (builder)

2021
Patricia Conroy (artist)
Randy Stark (builder)

2022
George Fox (artist)
Randall Prescott (builder)

See also

Canadian Country Music Association
CMT (Canada)
 List of music museums

References

External links
Official site
Canadian Country Music Hall of Fame
National Music Centre

Music halls of fame
Halls of fame in Canada
Organizations established in 1984
Country music museums